Gastón Baquero (1916–1997) was a Cuban poet and writer.

Works
 Poemas (La Habana, 1942)
 Saúl sobre su espada (La Habana, 1942)
 Ensayos''' (La Habana, 1948) 
 Poemas escritos en España (Madrid, 1960)
 Escritores hispanoamericanos de hoy' (Madrid, 1961)
 Memorial de un testigo (Madrid, 1966)
 La evolución del marxismo en Hispanoamérica (Madrid, 1966)
 Darío, Cernuda y otros temas poéticos (Madrid, 1969)
 Magias e invenciones (Madrid, 1984), poesías completas hasta la fecha, a cargo del poeta boliviano Pedro Shimose 
 Poemas invisibles (Madrid, 1991)
 Indios, blancos y negros en el caldero de América (Madrid, 1991) 
 Acercamiento a Dulce María Loynaz (Madrid, 1993)
 La fuente inagotable (Valencia, 1995).*Poesía (Salamanca, 1995)
 Ensayo (Salamanca, 1995)
 Poesía completa (Editorial Verbum, 1998), recogida por el poeta y editor cubano Pío Serrano
 The Angel of Rain. Poems by Gastón Baquero (Eastern Washington University Press, 2006), translated by Greg Simon and Steven F. White
 Geografía literaria. 1945–1996: crónicas y ensayos'' (Madrid, 2007), edición del escritor y periodista cubano-británico Alberto Díaz-Díaz

Cuban male writers
1916 births
1997 deaths
20th-century Cuban poets
20th-century male writers